Louise Kellogg may refer to:

Louise H. Kellogg (1959–2019), American geophysicist 
Louise Phelps Kellogg (1862–1942), American historian and educator
Louise Kellogg (philanthropist) 1903–2001), American dairy farmer and philanthropist, Alaska Women's Hall of Fame inductee